Tina Liebig (born 28 April 1980 in Gera) is a German professional racing cyclist.

Career wins

1998
UCI Road World Championships, junior road race
2003
Stage 5 Krasna Lipa Tour Féminine (CZE)
2004
General Classification Giro del Trentino Alto Adige - Südtirol (ITA)
 1st: Stage 1
2005
General Classification Krasna Lipa Tour Féminine (CZE)
2006 (Equipe Nürnberger Versicherung)
7th World University Cycling Championship, time trial
2009 (DSB Bank-LTO)

External links

1980 births
Living people
Sportspeople from Gera
German female cyclists
German track cyclists
Cyclists from Thuringia
21st-century German women